The Open Patent Alliance is a patent pool that was announced on June 9, 2008, for owners and claimants of patents and intellectual property related to the WiMAX standard. The inaugural members include Alcatel-Lucent, Cisco Systems, Clearwire, Intel, Samsung, and Sprint. Owners and claimants who have not joined the alliance include Wi-LAN and Qualcomm.

References
 OPA President Says Patent Pool Effort Must Change, WirelessWeek, June 2009
 WiMAX patent group issues call for patents, FierceBroadbandWireless, June 2009
 WiMAX group calls for patent pool, EE Times, June 2009

External links
 

Patent law organizations